The Miss Perú 1956 pageant was held on July 9, 1956.15 candidates were competing for the national crown that year. The chosen winner represented Peru at the Miss Universe 1956. The rest of the finalists would enter in different pageants.

Placements

Special awards
 Miss Photogenic - Callao - Lola Sabogal
 Miss Elegance - Huánuco - Rosario Ponce
 Miss Congeniality - Amazonas - Luzmila Duarte

Delegates

Amazonas - Luzmila Duarte
Apurímac - Edda Barbis
Arequipa - Alicia Lizárraga
Ayacucho - Teresa Villa
Callao - Lola Sabogal
Distrito Capital - Silvia Kessel
Huánuco - Rosario Ponce
Ica - Rosario Salcedo

Loreto - Elena Fateil
Madre de Dios - Chichi Santana
Moquegua - Nancy Eguren
Piura - Violeta Seminario
San Martín - Maggie Seoane
Tacna - Teresa García
USA Perú - Edith Beck

References 

Miss Peru
1956 in Peru
1956 beauty pageants